

Canadian Football News in 1931
The Ottawa Senators reverted to the name "Ottawa Rough Riders."

The Canadian Rugby Union approved the forward pass for all leagues and the first touchdown pass in Grey Cup history was a Warren Stevens to Kenny Grant play in Montreal's 22–0 win over Regina.

Convert scrimmage line was moved to the five-yard line, and the point could be scored by a drop-kick, place kick, run or pass.

The Montreal AAA Winged Wheelers were the first team outside Ontario to win the Grey Cup after shutting out the Regina Roughriders.

Regular season

Final regular season standings
Note: GP = Games Played, W = Wins, L = Losses, T = Ties, PF = Points For, PA = Points Against, Pts = Points
*Bold text means that they have clinched the playoffs.

* Victoria Games worth 4 points in standings

https://news.google.com/newspapers?id=jPcqAAAAIBAJ&sjid=TowFAAAAIBAJ&pg=6018%2C2188139 The Montreal Gazette – November 16, 1931

League Champions

Grey Cup playoffsNote: All dates in 1931ORFU finalSarnia advances to the East Semifinal.East semifinalWestern Ontario advances to the East Final.East finalMontreal advances to the Grey Cup game.Western semifinalsCalgary won the total-point series by 20–5. Calgary advances to the Western Final.Regina advances to the Western Final.West FinalsRegina advances to the Grey Cup game.''

Playoff bracket

Grey Cup Championship

1931 Canadian Football Awards
 Jeff Russel Memorial Trophy (IRFU MVP) – Gordie Perry (RB), Montreal AAA Winged Wheelers

References

 
Canadian Football League seasons